Devi Prasad Bagrodia, is a noted writer, social worker and tea planter  based in Dibrugarh in Assam, India.

Biography

Early life
Devi Prasad Bagrodia was born to Shew Bhagovan Bagrodia of Bhekulajuan village of Tengakhat in Dibrugarh district in Assam on 8 November 1939. He was groomed in a total Assamese rural set-up in his village.

Education
Devi Prasad Bagrodia finished matriculation from Tengakhat HE School in Assamese medium. He studied ISc and then studied up to BA at DHS Kanoi College at Dibrugarh.

Career

Published works
Devi Prasad Bagrodia is author of admirable number of books; mostly translation of famous work of Assamese authors. He translated the complete work of Jyoti Prasad Agarwala into Hindi in the form of two books - Jyoti Sudha in 1991 and Jyoti Prabha in 1995. The latter was released by Dr Shankar Dayal Sharma, the Vice President of India. All these work showcasing the Assamese literature and culture have been received well by the scholars at the national level. Recently he has completed translation of Borgeets composed by Mahapurush Sankardev and Madhavdev, beside having translated Gunamala, a transcreation of Bhagavata Purana in Assamese language by Mahapurush Sankardev into Hindi. Bagrodia’s literary work include the Hindi translation of Dr Nagen Saikia’s Mit-Bhash, Chah Gasar Kalam, Sukhor Prithivi, Mirabai, Agastha Yatra etc.

He also published a book titled 'Tha Agarwala Family of Tezpur' written by Bibekananda Agarwala. His other publications include 'You and Me on a Journey to Light' by Candraprasāda Śaikīẏā Ananda Bormudoi

Awards
Bagrodia is a recipient of the Central Hindi Directorate’s award of ‘Translator of remarkable standard’ in 1999 under the Union Ministry of Human Resource Development (India), ‘Fulchand Khandelwar Samhati Award’ in 2002 and ‘Meera Samman’ by the Meera Smruti Sansthan of Chittorgarh, Rajasthan in 2011 and a few others.

Gallery

References

1939 births
Living people
Writers from Assam
Indian planters